Trans World or Transworld may refer to:

Companies
 Trans World Airlines (TWA)
 Trans World Connection, a affiliated brand name of the airline
 Trans World Corporation, a holding company for the airline
 Trans World Express, a regional carrier for the airline
 Transworld Associates, a fiber optic undersea cable in Pakistan
 Trans World Communications, a defunct UK radio broadcasting company
 Trans World Entertainment, an American chain of entertainment media retail stores
 Trans World International, an event company of International Management Group (IMG)
 Trans World Sport, a sports-related television program produced by Trans World International
 Trans World Radio, a Christian broadcasting company
 Trans-World Group, a London-based aluminium company, active in Russia in the 1990s

Magazines
 Transworld Motocross, a motocross magazine
 Transworld Skateboarding, a skateboarding magazine
 Transworld Snowboarding, a snowboarding magazine

Other uses 
 Transworld (horse), a racehorse
 Trans World (video game) (1990), business simulation
 Transworld Publishers, a publishing company in the United Kingdom

See also
 Trans (disambiguation)
 World (disambiguation)